Parker House may refer to:

Buildings

Canada
 Parker Octagon House or the James Parker Octagon House in Niagara Falls, Ontario is the Bradley Octagon House

United States

Alabama
 Parker–Reynolds House, Anniston, Alabama, listed on the National Register of Historic Places (NRHP) in Calhoun County

Arkansas
 Womack–Parker House, Nashville, Arkansas, NRHP-listed
 Parker House (Star City, Arkansas), NRHP-listed

California
 Parker House (Orange, California), listed on the NRHP in Orange County

Connecticut
 Samuel Parker House, Coventry, Connecticut, of Parker-Hutchinson Farm, NRHP-listed
 Parker House (Old Saybrook, Connecticut), NRHP-listed

Georgia
 Aaron and Margaret Parker Jr. House, Stockbridge, Georgia listed on the NRHP in Rockdale County

Hawaii
 James and Catherine Parker House, Hilo, Hawaii, listed on the NRHP in Hawaii County

Idaho
 John Parker House (Boise, Idaho), listed on the NRHP in Ada County

Illinois
 Parker House (Oak Park, Illinois)

Iowa
 Parker House (Guttenberg, Iowa), NRHP-listed

Kansas
 Martin Van Buren Parker House, Olathe, Kansas, listed on the NRHP in Johnson County

Kentucky
 Southgate–Parker–Maddux House, Newport, Kentucky, listed on the NRHP in Campbell County
 Richard Parker House, Petersburg, Kentucky, listed on the NRHP in Boone County
 Parker House (Somerset, Kentucky), listed on the NRHP in Pulaski County

Maine
 Parker House (Blue Hill, Maine), NRHP-listed

Massachusetts
 Parker House Hotel, Boston, Massachusetts, now known as the Omni Parker House
 Parker House (Haven Street, Reading, Massachusetts), NRHP-listed
 Parker House (Salem Street, Reading, Massachusetts), NRHP-listed
 Joseph Parker House, Reading, Massachusetts, NRHP-listed
 Capt. Nathaniel Parker Red House, Reading, Massachusetts, NRHP-listed
 Samuel Parker House (Reading, Massachusetts), NRHP-listed
 Stillman Parker House, Reading, Massachusetts, NRHP-listed
 William Parker House, Reading, Massachusetts, NRHP-listed
 Parker Tavern, Reading, Massachusetts, NRHP-listed
 James Parker House, Shirley, Massachusetts, NRHP-listed
 Parker–Burnett House, Somerville, Massachusetts, NRHP-listed
 Parker House (Winchester, Massachusetts), NRHP-listed
 Edmund Parker Jr. House, Winchester, Massachusetts, NRHP-listed
 Harrison Parker Sr. House, Winchester, Massachusetts, NRHP-listed

Michigan
 Thomas A. Parker House, Detroit, Michigan, listed on the NRHP in Wayne County
 Arthur M. Parker House, Detroit, Michigan, listed on the NRHP in Wayne County

Minnesota
 Charles and Grace Parker House, Minneapolis, Minnesota, NRHP-listed

Missouri
 Lester S. and Missouri "Zue" Gordon Parker House, Jefferson City, Missouri, NRHP-listed

New Jersey
 John Parker Tavern, Bernardsville, New Jersey, NRHP-listed
 Parker Homestead, Little Silver, New Jersey, NRHP-listed
 Parker House, Sea Girt, New Jersey, a bar/nightclub and former hotel

New York
 Charles Parker House, Guilderland, New York, listed on the NRHP in Albany County
 Leech–Parker Farmhouse, Lima, New York, NRHP-listed
 Charlie Parker Residence, New York, New York, NRHP-listed

North Carolina
 Royal–Crumpler–Parker House, Clinton, North Carolina, NRHP-listed
 James H. Parker House, Enfield, North Carolina, NRHP-listed
 Francis Parker House, Murfreesboro, North Carolina, NRHP-listed
 King Parker House, Winton, North Carolina, NRHP-listed

Ohio
 John P. Parker House, Ripley, Ohio, a U.S. National Historic Landmark

Oklahoma
 Quanah Parker Star House, Cache, Oklahoma, NRHP-listed

Oregon
 Moses Parker House, Albany, Oregon, listed on the NRHP in Linn County
 Roe–Parker House, Hood River, Oregon, NRHP-listed

Texas
 James F. and Susie R. Parker House, Austin, Texas, listed on the NRHP in Travis County
 Milton Parker House, Bryan, Texas, listed on the NRHP in Brazos County
 John W. Parker House, Houston, Texas, listed on the NRHP in Harris County
 Parker–Bradshaw House, Lufkin, Texas, listed on the NRHP in Angelina County

Utah
 Joseph William Parker Farm, Joseph, Utah, listed on the NRHP in Sevier County

West Virginia
 Sloan–Parker House, Junction, West Virginia, listed on the NRHP in Hampshire County

Food and drink brands 
 Parker House roll, a type of bread roll created at the Parker House hotel in Boston
 Parker House Sausage Company, meat company in Chicago, Illinois

See also
 John Parker House (disambiguation)
 Samuel Parker House (disambiguation)
 Parker Building (disambiguation)